The eleventh legislative assembly election of Tamil Nadu was held on 2 May 1996. The Dravida Munnetra Kazhagam (DMK) led front won the election and its leader M. Karunanidhi, became the chief minister. This was his fourth term in office. S. Balakrishnan, also known as So. Balakrishnan, of Tamil Maanila Congress ( TMC ), became the Leader of the Opposition. The incumbent All India Anna Dravida Munnetra Kazhagam (AIADMK) government was defeated in a landslide with its general secretary and outgoing chief minister J. Jayalalithaa losing the election from the Bargur constituency. She became the first Incumbent Chief Minister since M. Bakthavatsalam in 1967 to lose her own constituency.

Background

Anti-Jayalalithaa
The J. Jayalalithaa led All India Anna Dravida Munnetra Kazhagam (AIADMK) government, which had been in power since 1991 was beset with corruption scandals and public discontent. A series of corruption scandals, a growing reputation for high handedness and an extravagant public wedding for Jayalalithaa's foster son Sudhakaran all combined to erode the AIADMK support base and the goodwill she had enjoyed with the electorate in the 1991 elections.

Formation of TMC
The AIADMK's alliance with Indian National Congress (INC), which had helped it to win the 1991 elections ran into trouble midway through the AIADMK's term. J. Jayalalithaa terminated the alliance and Congress served as the principal opposition party in the Tamil Nadu Legislative Assembly. When the 1996 elections drew closer, it was expected that the Congress would contest the elections in alliance with the DMK. However against the wishes of the Tamil Nadu state unit of the Congress, the national congress leader (and then Indian prime minister) P. V. Narasimha Rao announced that the Congress would ally with the AIADMK. This led to a split in the Tamil Nadu Congress with a majority of the party workers and cadre forming the Tamil Maanila Congress (TMC) led by G. K. Moopanar. The TMC contested the elections in alliance with the DMK.

Formation of MDMK
In 1993, the DMK suffered a split when one of its more prominent second rung leaders, Vaiko was expelled from the party membership. The next year Vaiko floated a new party – the Marumalarchi Dravida Munnetra Kazhagam (MDMK).

Coalitions
There were four main coalitions in the 1996 elections. The DMK-TMC front which also included the Communist Party of India (CPI) and the AIADMK-Congress front were the main political groupings in the state. Both fronts had a number of smaller parties as constituents. The Indian National League and the All India Forward Bloc were part of the DMK front, while the AIADMK front also had Muslim Leagues, Forward Block, All India Republic Party, Uzhavar Uzhaippalar Katchi and United Communist Party. Apart from these two fronts, there was a MDMK led coalition which included the Communist Party of India (Marxist) (CPM), the Janata Dal (JD) and the Samajwadi Janata Party (SJP). The alliance between Pattali Makkal Katchi (PMK) and All India Indira Congress (Tiwari) (Tiwari Congress) led by Vazhappady Ramamurthy was the fourth coalition that contested the elections. Initially, before the TMC was formed, the DMK put together a seven party alliance comprising itself, PMK, CPI, Tiwari Congress and a few other parties. However, this alliance fell through when the Tiwari Congress and PMK left the front after differences between Karunanidhi and Ramamurthy. After this, Cho Ramaswamy (editor of Thuglak) played a vital role in bringing together the DMK-TMC coalition and obtaining actor Rajinikanth's support for it.  There were a few other smaller political formations and parties contesting the election – the Bharatiya Janata Party (BJP) contested the elections alone; Subramanian Swamy's Janata Party contested in alliance with the caste organisation Devendra Kula Vellar Sangam led by Dalit leader K. Krishnasamy.

Rajinikanth's support
The DMK-TMC alliance enlisted the popular Tamil film actor Rajinikanth to campaign against the AIADMK in the elections. Rajinikanth declared his support for the DMK-TMC combine and members of his numerous fan clubs campaigned for the DMK front across Tamil Nadu. In a widely watched campaign appearance broadcast in Sun TV, he declared "even God cannot save Tamil Nadu if AIADMK returns to power".Rajinikanth's support gave enormous victory to DMK

Seat allotments

AIADMK-INC Front

DMK-TMC Front

MDMK-CPI(M) Front

PMK-Tiwari Congress Front

Voting and results
Polling took place on 2 May 1996 and results were announced on 12 May. The turnout among registered voters was 66.95%. The assembly elections were held simultaneously along with the Indian parliamentary elections.

Constituency results

List of winners and runners-up by constituency

Impact
AIADMK suffered a rout in the elections. Most of sitting ministers of the AIADMK government, including the chief minister Jayalalithaa lost their seats. Jayalalithaa lost to DMK's E. G. Sugavanam by a margin of 8,366 votes in the Bargur constituency. A year after the election, the AIADMK split, when a faction led by the Arantaki MLA Su. Thirunavukkarasar broke away from the party. The MDMK which was contesting its first statewide elections since its formation in 1994 drew a blank. MDMK leader Vaiko was defeated in both the Vilathikulam Assembly constituency and the Sivakasi parliamentary constituency. This election also saw the PMK electing four members to the assembly. The massive victory of the DMK-TMC-CPI combine in the assembly elections spilled over to the parliamentary elections. The coalition was able to win all 39 parliamentary seats in Tamil Nadu and the lone parliamentary seat in the nearby Pondicherry. This tally of 40 seats enabled the DMK-TMC combine to be part of the United Front government during 1996–98.

Cabinet

| After the death of the minister Thiru V.Thangapandian there is a Inclusion of Thiru Pasumpon Tha Kirittinan as Minister for  Highways and seniority changes done he is placed in No 9 in ministers list and the cabinet re-designated several changes shuffling done.

See also 
 Elections in Tamil Nadu
 Legislature of Tamil Nadu
 Government of Tamil Nadu

References

External links
 Election Commission of India

State Assembly elections in Tamil Nadu
1990s in Tamil Nadu
Tamil Nadu
May 1996 events in Asia
1996 in Indian politics